David S. Wright (born 1944) is a Canadian former diplomat. He served most recently as Canada's permanent representative to the North Atlantic Treaty Organization from 1997 to 2003.

Education and family 

He was born in Montreal, Quebec. He graduated from Lower Canada College in 1962. He studied economics and mathematics at McGill University and graduated in 1966. He received an MBA in international finance from Columbia University in 1968.

He is married to Ilze Skuja. They have one son, Julian, who served as a law clerk to Justice Rosalie Abella at the Supreme Court of Canada, as a lawyer at Sullivan and Cromwell's New York office and now as a lawyer at the Global Fund in Geneva. His brothers, James R. Wright and Robert G. Wright, are also a retired diplomats, serving most recently as Canada's high commissioner to the United Kingdom from 2006 to 2011 and ambassador to China from 2005 to 2009, respectively.

Diplomatic career 

He joined the Department of External Affairs in 1968 and went on his first overseas posting to Rome in 1969. Throughout the 1970s and 1980s, he alternated between overseas postings and positions in Ottawa. He served as director of the department's Policy Planning Bureau from 1982 to 1985, during which he helped draft the department's May 1985 green paper, Competitiveness and Security: Directions for Canada's International Relations.

He served as Assistant Deputy Minister for Europe in the recently renamed Department of Foreign Affairs and International Trade from 1990 to 1994, helping shape Canada's response to the downfall of the Soviet Union, the Gulf War and the outbreak of the Yugoslav Wars.

He became Canada's ambassador to Spain in 1994, serving during the Canadian-Spanish fishing dispute known as the Turbot War in 1995. He was named Canada's ambassador and permanent representative to the North Atlantic Treaty Organization in 1997, serving during the Kosovo War and the aftermath of the September 11th attacks, including the War in Afghanistan and the Iraq War. He was Dean of the North Atlantic Council from 2000 to 2003. He retired in 2003 after 35 years in the Canadian foreign service.

Post-diplomatic career 

He is currently the Kenneth and Patricia Taylor Distinguished Visiting Professor in Foreign Affairs, Victoria College, University of Toronto. He currently teaches a course on world affairs in Vic One, a seminar program for first year students; and a fourth year seminar course on contemporary issues in foreign policy.

He is also a special advisor to Dale & Lessmann LLP, a Canadian law firm, where he keeps clients abreast of developments in trade negotiations, particularly on the proposed Canada-European Union Comprehensive Economic and Trade Agreement.

External links
 NATO CV

Notes 

1944 births
Ambassadors of Canada to Andorra
Ambassadors of Canada to Monaco
Ambassadors of Canada to Spain
Anglophone Quebec people
Living people
People from Montreal
Permanent Representatives of Canada to NATO